Cychrus dolichognathus is a species of ground beetle in the subfamily of Carabinae. It was described by Deuve in 1990.

References

dolichognathus
Beetles described in 1990